Beckles is a surname of English origin, derived from the market town of Beccles in Suffolk. People with the surname include:

 Albert Beckles (born 1930), American bodybuilder
 Edward Beckles (1816–1902), Barbadian clergyman
 Sir Hilary Beckles (born 1955), Barbadian academic
 Ian Beckles (born 1967), Canadian player of American football
 Kanika Beckles (born 1991), Trinidadian sprinter
 Kierre Beckles (born 1990), Barbadian athlete
 Mark Beckles (born 1964), Canadian insurance broker and political candidate
 Pennelope Beckles (born 1961), Trinidadian politician
 Samuel Beckles (1814–1890), English dinosaur hunter
 Yolande Beckles (born 1962), British educator

English toponymic surnames